Constantinos Stathelakos (Konstandinos Stathelakos; born 30 December 1987) is a Cypriot track and field athlete who competes in the hammer throw. He was born in Lamia, Greece and transferred his international eligibility to Cyprus after 2009. He competed in the hammer throw at the 2012 Summer Olympics for Cyprus.

Competition record

References

External links
 

1987 births
Living people
Sportspeople from Lamia (city)
Cypriot male hammer throwers
Greek male hammer throwers
Olympic athletes of Cyprus
Athletes (track and field) at the 2012 Summer Olympics
Commonwealth Games competitors for Cyprus
Athletes (track and field) at the 2014 Commonwealth Games
Athletes (track and field) at the 2018 Commonwealth Games
Athletes (track and field) at the 2013 Mediterranean Games
Mediterranean Games competitors for Cyprus